Kyle Adam Regnault (born December 13, 1988), nicknamed "Leaf", is an American professional baseball pitcher in the San Diego Padres organization. He had played for the Hiroshima Toyo Carp of Nippon Professional Baseball (NPB).

Career
Regnault attended La Salle Academy in Providence, Rhode Island. In his senior year, he was named to Rhode Island's All-State baseball team and won a state championship in wrestling. He attended Chipola College for two years, and played college baseball for the Chipola Indians. He then transferred to the University of Rhode Island, where he continued his college baseball career for the Rhode Island Rams. While with the Rams, Regnault underwent Tommy John surgery, limiting him to 13 games pitched in his two years there. In 2009, he played collegiate summer baseball with the Brewster Whitecaps of the Cape Cod Baseball League. Regnault was not selected in the Major League Baseball draft, and began his professional career with the Worcester Tornadoes and the Québec Capitales of the Canadian American Association of Professional Baseball.

Regnault met Phil Regan, a pitching coach in the New York Mets' organization, at a golf course in Florida during the 2013 offseason. The Mets signed Regnault before the 2015 season, and he pitched for the St. Lucie Mets of the Class A-Advanced Florida State League. He played in the Arizona Fall League after the regular season. Regnault missed playing time during the 2016 season due to a shoulder injury. In 2017, Regault began the season with the Binghamton Rumble Ponies of the Class AA Eastern League, and the Mets promoted him to the Las Vegas 51s of the Class AAA Pacific Coast League during the season.

On November 16, 2018, Regnault signed with the Hiroshima Toyo Carp of Nippon Professional Baseball (NPB). On December 2, 2019, he become free agent.

In the 2019 offseason, Regnault signed a minor league deal with the San Diego Padres.

Personal life
Regnault has three brothers. Two of them wrestled in college.

References

External links

1988 births
Living people
American expatriate baseball players in Canada
American expatriate baseball players in Japan
Baseball pitchers
Baseball players from Providence, Rhode Island
Binghamton Mets players
Binghamton Rumble Ponies players
Brewster Whitecaps players
Brooklyn Cyclones players
Chipola Indians baseball players
Gulf Coast Mets players
Hiroshima Toyo Carp players
La Salle Academy alumni
Las Vegas 51s players
Nippon Professional Baseball pitchers
Québec Capitales players
Rhode Island Rams baseball players
St. Lucie Mets players
Salt River Rafters players
Scottsdale Scorpions players
Worcester Tornadoes players